Empty Sky is the debut studio album by British singer-songwriter Elton John, released on 6 June 1969. It was not issued in the United States until January 1975 (on MCA), with different cover art, well after John's fame had been established internationally.

Background
Recorded during the winter of 1968 and spring of 1969 in a DJM Records 8-track studio, Empty Sky is the only album in the early part of Elton John's career not produced by Gus Dudgeon, instead helmed by friend and DJM staffer Steve Brown. The album was released in the UK in both stereo and mono, the latter now being a rare collector's item.

John plays harpsichord on several tracks, including "Skyline Pigeon", which John has described as being "the first song Bernie and I ever got excited about that we ever wrote."

John used musicians who were friends either of him or of Brown. Guitarist Caleb Quaye and drummer Roger Pope, both at the time members of the band Hookfoot, played on many of the tracks. (Quaye and Pope would rejoin John a few years later as part of his studio and touring band behind Rock of the Westies in 1975 and Blue Moves in 1976.) Tony Murray from The Troggs played bass. Empty Sky is the first appearance with John of then Plastic Penny and Spencer Davis Group member Nigel Olsson, who played drums on "Lady What's Tomorrow?" (Olsson and fellow Spencer Davis bandmate, bassist Dee Murray, would soon join John as his early 1970s touring band.) Also listed in the production credits is Clive Franks, who would later produce John's live sound in concert for a tremendous amount of his touring career, as well as occasionally co-produce with John on albums such as A Single Man and 21 at 33. The original sleeve design was done by David Larkham (billed as "Dave"), who would go on to create designs for John and other artists.

"Skyline Pigeon" is the most popular and best-known song on the album, and the only one which John, albeit infrequently, still performs as part of his live shows. The more definitive version of "Skyline Pigeon" featuring an orchestra and piano backing in place of harpsichord was recorded for 1973's Don't Shoot Me I'm Only the Piano Player, and initially appeared as the B-side of "Daniel" in 1973. Another appearance of the song was in 1974, when a version recorded in London was featured as the opening track on the Here and There live LP and its 1995 CD reissue. A version of the title track, "Empty Sky", was also included at various stops on John's 1975 tour.

Although John has since called the album naive, he does have fond memories of making the record. These include walking home from recording at 4 a.m. and lodging at the Salvation Army HQ in Oxford Street, which was run by Steve Brown's father. "I remember when we finished work on the title track – it just floored me. I thought it was the best thing I'd ever heard in my life," John recalled. He later recalled that he was "unsure what style I was going to be ... [maybe what] Leonard Cohen sounds like."

Reception

A contemporary review from Disc & Music Echo said, "Can't help feeling that the lyrics could still do with a little more intensity, a little less youthful pretension. But that's just carping because the music is so nice and pretty that you can't really put it down. Well worth a good, deep listen." AllMusic's retrospective review showed a subdued reaction to the material, concluding "There aren't any forgotten gems on Empty Sky, but it does suggest John's potential."

Track listing
 

Notes
"Val-Hala" was titled "Valhalla" on the 1975 US reissue.
"Hay Chewed" was titled "It's Hay-Chewed" on the 1995 CD reissue.

Personnel
 Elton John – vocals, piano, organ, Hohner Pianet, harpsichord
 Caleb Quaye – electric guitar, acoustic guitar, congas
 Tony Murray – bass guitar
 Roger Pope – drums, percussion
 Nigel Olsson – drums on "Lady What's Tomorrow"
 Don Fay – saxophone, flute
 Graham Vickery – harmonica

Production
 Steve Brown – producer
 Frank Owen – engineer
 Clive Franks – tape operator, whistling
 Dave Larkham – sleeve design, illustration
 Jim Goff – sleeve production
 Tony Brandon – original sleeve notes 
 David Symonds – original sleeve notes 
 Gus Dudgeon – liner notes
 John Tobler – liner notes

Charts

Weekly charts

Year-end charts

References

External links

1969 debut albums
Elton John albums
MCA Records albums
DJM Records albums
Progressive pop albums
Folk rock albums by English artists
Psychedelic rock albums by English artists